Pinnaduwage Aravinda de Silva is a former cricketer and captain of the Sri Lanka national cricket team. He scored centuries (scores of 100 runs or more in a single innings) in Test and One Day International (ODI) cricket matches organised by the International Cricket Council (ICC). He was named as one of the Wisden Cricketers of the Year in 1996. Identified as "one of the game's best entertainers" by ESPNcricinfo's Simon Wilde, De Silva scored 20 centuries in Tests and 11 in ODIs.

De Silva debuted in 1984 and scored his first Test century in October 1985 against Pakistan. In a man-of-the-match performance, he scored 122 in an eight-and-a-half-hours innings. He repeated the feat of scoring centuries in both innings in the same year, when he scored 146 and 120 against India in another man-of-the-match performance. De Silva's highest Test score of 267, achieved in January 1991 in Wellington, was reached in 380 balls against New Zealand. The performance is the sixth-highest score by a Sri Lankan batsman in Test cricket. De Silva scored his twenty Test centuries against seven different opponents, and was most successful against Pakistan, making eight. , he is thirty-fourth in the international Test century-makers list, and third in the Sri Lankan list.

De Silva's maiden ODI century was against India in 1990; he scored 104 runs off 124 balls. His highest score in ODIs is 145, against Kenya in the 1996 Cricket World Cup. His score led Sri Lanka to 398, the highest ODI total by any team at that time; it was also the first century made by a Sri Lankan in a World Cup. He also scored a century in the second innings of the final, making 107 runs not out. , he is twenty-sixth in the list of all-time ODI century-makers and sixth in the equivalent list for Sri Lanka. He was most successful against Pakistan, scoring 11 centuries in both Tests and ODIs put together. De Silva also holds the record for the tenth-fastest Test double century, which he attained while playing against Bangladesh in 2002.

Key

Test centuries

One Day International centuries

Notes

References

External links
 
 

De Sila, Aravinda
De Sila, Aravinda